Sechew Powell (born June 6, 1979) is an American former professional boxer who competed from 2002 to 2014 and challenged for the IBF junior middleweight title in 2011.

Early life
Powell was born and raised in Brownsville, Brooklyn of Jamaican immigrant parents.

Powell’s father and former manager is Novric Powell. He is the brother of UFC mixed martial arts champion David Branch
, whom Powell has helped train for fights, of college wrestler Novric Reese
, and of fellow middleweight boxer Jamelle Hamilton, who has fought alongside Powell in multiple tournaments.

Amateur career
Nicknamed "Iron Horse", Powell was an amateur standout. In a rare event, Powell and his brother Jamelle Hamilton were crowned co-champions of the 139-pound novice division in the Daily News Golden Gloves.

Powell was the 2000 National Golden Gloves Light Middleweight Champion and 2001 United States Amateur Light middleweight champion. He won the world under 19 championship in Baku, Azerbaijan in 1998 and received a full scholarship at the U.S. Olympic Education Center at Northern Michigan University in 2002, where he trained with coach Al Mitchell  and studied forensic engineering and auto repair.

Professional career
Powell turned pro in 2002 and was undefeated in his first 20 fights before losing to Kassim Ouma in 2006. In 2007, he won a close decision over Ishe Smith and had a KO win over Terrance Cauthen.

After racking up a 15-0 record, in May 2005 Powell met the also unbeaten Cornelius Bundrage. Seconds coming into the fight, Bundrage and Powell threw simultaneous right hands to each other's chin, resulting in an extremely rare double knockdown. In shock of the event the referee did not score any knockdowns and Powell immediately sent down Bundrage for the second time with a straight left, who fell two times while trying to stand up and the bout was stopped.

He trained with coach Buddy McGirt in his professional career. Powell also trained out of Gleason's Gym in Brooklyn.

On June 11, 2008 Powell fought Deandre Latimore at the Hard Rock Cafe in New York City. Powell entered the fight ranked #1 by the IBF in the junior middleweight division. Both men hurt each other repeatedly throughout the fight, but it was Latimore who came up big in the seventh round when he hurt Powell with a right hook.  An uppercut rocked Powell along the ropes and his head was repeatedly snapped back as he absorbed punch after punch.  With less than a minute left in the round, the referee stepped in and called it off, much to the dismay of Powell. At the time of the stoppage, all three judges had the fight even, 57-57.

Powell tested positive for marijuana in his post-fight drug test and was suspended for 60 days by the New York State Athletic Commission.

Powell avenged his loss to Latimore by fighting him again two years later and winning with a twelve-round majority decision in an IBF title eliminator in Durant, Oklahoma.

Professional boxing record

References

External links 
 

1979 births
Living people
Light-middleweight boxers
Boxers from New York City
National Golden Gloves champions
Sportspeople from Brooklyn
American male boxers